Compsa amoena is a species of beetle in the family Cerambycidae. It was described by Fisher in 1937.

References

Neoibidionini
Beetles described in 1937